Shilshole Bay is the part of Puget Sound east of a line drawn northeasterly from Seattle's West Point in the southwest to its Golden Gardens Park in the northeast. On its shores lie Discovery Park, the Lawton Wood section of the Magnolia neighborhood, the neighborhood of Ballard, and Golden Gardens Park. It is home to the Shilshole Bay Marina on Ballard's Seaview Avenue N.W. and communicates with the Lake Washington Ship Canal via the Ballard Locks.

History
The name derives from the Duwamish word meaning "threading a needle", perhaps referring to the narrow opening through which Salmon Bay empties into Shilshole Bay.

The Shilshole Bay was once home to the Sheel-shol-ashbsh people, now called ‘Shilshole’.  The tribe had several large longhouses deep inside Shilshole Bay. The tribe went into decline in the late 19th century as settlers began to populate the area.

Landforms of Seattle
Bays of Washington (state)
Landforms of Puget Sound
Bays of King County, Washington
Washington placenames of Native American origin

References